Am Oved ("A Working People") is an Israeli publishing house.

History
Am Oved was founded in 1942 by Berl Katznelson, who was its first editor in chief. It was created as an organ of the Histadrut, Israel's federation of Labor, with a goal of publishing books that would "meet the spiritual needs of the working public." Today Am Oved seeks "to enrich the cultural experience of readers of Hebrew from all walks of life with high-quality, widely-appealing books in a great variety of genres".

Am Oved is one of Israel's leading publishing houses, with around 100 new titles annually, in addition to 250 reprints of classics of Hebrew literature and world literature in translation. Its best known series is "Sifriyah La'am" (People's Library), a series of paperback fiction, similar in many respects to Penguin.

See also
Culture of Israel

References 

Book publishing companies of Israel
Jewish printing and publishing
Publishing companies established in 1942
1942 establishments in Mandatory Palestine